MOD Pizza is an American fast-casual pizza restaurant chain based in Seattle, Washington. Founded in 2008, MOD has more than 500 locations  in the United States and one location in Canada. MOD is a company that is claimed by its owners to be "more about the people than the pizza" and to focus on paying living wages and providing employees with opportunities to give back to the community.

Concept and products
The acronym "MOD" in the company's name stands for "Made on Demand."  Restaurant trade publication QSR News has characterized the concept as the "Chipotle of the pizza industry."

MOD Pizza offers individual, customizable pizzas made with organic dough using King Arthur Flour. Customers specify which ingredients they want included on their order, and watch the preparation process, though the restaurant also offers recommended combinations.

The decor and layout of MOD restaurants has been described as "family-friendly," with Zagat observing it has a "simple and functional vibe that ties in nicely with its DIY theme." The interior of each MOD restaurant is unique and "locally inspired."

Blaze Pizza, Pieology, & Pizza Rev are all considered direct competitors to MOD Pizza.

History
MOD Pizza was established in 2008 in Seattle, Washington, by co-founders Scott and Ally Svenson. The Svensons previously founded the Seattle Coffee Company, a coffee company based in the United Kingdom, which they sold to Starbucks in 1998. Afterwards Scott stayed on as president of Starbucks Europe. The Svensons also helped found Carluccio's Ltd., an Italian restaurant in the U.K. After moving back to their home town of Bellevue, Washington, the Svensons started MOD Pizza after being unable to find fast, affordable healthy meals for their four sons. James Markham, who had previously started pizza parlors in San Diego, California and Shanghai, China, was also a part of the founding team and helped develop the house recipes used by MOD. The restaurant's first location was in Union Square and was followed by additional Seattle locations.

By 2010, Markham had left MOD Pizza due to what he later characterized as a dispute in direction with the Svensons. He subsequently started a California-based chain set on MOD's "DIY" pizza concept called Pieology.

Growth and expansion
In 2013, the restaurant chain was named one of the United States' "Top 50 Breakout Brands" by Nation's Restaurant News. The same year, it added its first location outside of Washington, with a restaurant at Cedar Hills Crossing shopping center in Beaverton, Oregon.

By 2014, MOD Pizza had 31 locations in Washington, Oregon, California, Arizona, Colorado, and Texas. The same year the company secured $15 million in private investment. Notable backers included Dunkin' Donuts president Paul Twohig and TOMS Shoes Chief Executive Officer Jim Alling.

In 2015, MOD Pizza raised $40 million in new funding for a total of $70 million in investment capital to fund an aggressive national growth strategy. The main investor was a private equity fund, PWP Growth Equity. MOD's growth is also accelerated by the addition of several franchise partnerships. The "purpose-led fast casual concept" reached the 1,700-employee milestone in August 2015.

In March 2016, MOD Pizza announced that they had secured $32 million in a funding round and had plans to expand to 190 stores. In June, the company opened their first international location in Leeds, United Kingdom. Additional expansion in the United Kingdom with joint venture partner Sir Charles Dunstone and his business partner, Roger Taylor, began in 2015. MOD named John Nelson, formerly of Nando's U.K., as their CEO of U.K. operations in January 2016. MOD Pizza closed all nine UK locations in 2020.

In January 2017, MOD Pizza had open its 200th location, which was located in Frederick, Maryland. At the time of the opening, the company had locations in 20 states, including Arizona, California, Colorado, Florida, Idaho, Illinois, Kansas, Kentucky, Maryland, Michigan, Missouri, Montana, New Jersey, North Carolina, Ohio, Oregon, Pennsylvania, South Carolina, Texas, Utah, Virginia, Washington and Wisconsin, along with five locations in the United Kingdom.

In its tenth year of business, MOD announced the opening of its 300th location in 2018.

In May 2019, MOD Pizza raised $160 million in a funding round and plans to expand to 1,000 stores within next five years.

MOD Pizza opened its first Canadian location (Langford, B.C.) in 2019, which remains the only location listed on the company's Canadian web site as of August 2021.

By 2020 the company had grown to 400 locations and $400 million USD in revenue.

In May 2021, the company announced a promotion celebrating its 500th location.

Awards 
 #7 of Fortune Magazine's 20 Best Places to Work in Retail in 2015.
 2015 Community Impact Award for "Job Creation and Workplace Development" by Seattle Business Magazine. 
 FEAT Reach for the Stars Award for Best Employer 
 50 Breakout Brands by Restaurant News in 2013

See also
 List of pizza chains of the United States

References

External links
 

Pizza chains of the United States
Pizza franchises
Restaurant chains in the United States
Fast casual restaurants
Restaurants established in 2008
Restaurants in Seattle
Companies based in Bellevue, Washington
2008 establishments in Washington (state)